State Route 13 (SR 13) is a  state highway in the western part of the U.S. state of Alabama. Except for a portion roughly between Berry and Russellville, SR 13 is the unsigned designation for U.S. Route 43 (US 43).

The southern terminus of US 43 and SR 13 is at their intersection with US 90 and unsigned SR 16 in Mobile. The northern terminus of the route is on US 43 at the Tennessee state line north of Killen in Lauderdale County. As a signed route, the southern terminus of the route is at the intersection of US 43 and SR 18 in southern Fayette County, and the northern terminus as at US 43 and SR 17 south of Russellville in Franklin County.

Route description
In Phil Campbell, SR 13 splits off of US 43, continuing on its right-of-way. It enters the town and meets SR 237. It then enters Marion County.  It enters Bear Creek and intersects SR 172. It turns east-to-west and leaves Marion County, entering into Winston County.  The route immediately enters the city of Haleyville. It turns north-to-south again and meets SR 195 and SR 129. It leaves the city and continues south for about ten miles to Natural Bridge. It intersects SR 5 south and US 278. SR 5 continues south along SR 13's right-of-way. SR 13 maintains a mile-long concurrency with US Route 278, before turning onto its own right-of-way. It continues south until it crosses the county line into Walker County.  It eventually intersects I-22/US 78 and also passes through Eldridge, meeting SR 118 in the process.  It then crosses into Fayette County.  It intersects SR 102 near Hubbertville. It enters Berry and meets US 43 once again with SR 18. US 43 joins SR 13 along its journey south to Tuscaloosa and Mobile. SR 18 continues east to Oakman.  This route serves as an effective bypass to US 43 for people traveling from Muscle Shoals to Tuscaloosa, or even making the long drive down all the way to Mobile, bypassing multiple large cities and not diverting from its path like US 43.

Major intersections

See also

References

External links

013
013
U.S. Route 43
Transportation in Fayette County, Alabama
Transportation in Walker County, Alabama
Transportation in Winston County, Alabama
Transportation in Marion County, Alabama
Transportation in Franklin County, Alabama